The history of the Jews in Peru begins with the arrival of migration flows from Europe, Near East and Northern Africa.

History
Some Jewish conversos arrived at the time of the Spanish Conquest in Peru. Then, only Christians were allowed to take part in expeditions to the New World. At first, they had lived without restrictions because the Inquisition was not active in Peru (at the beginning of the Viceroyalty). Then, with the advent of the Inquisition, 'New Christians' began to be persecuted, and, in some cases, executed. In this period, these people were sometimes called "marranos" ("pigs"), converts ("conversos"), and "Cristianos nuevos" (New Christians) even if they had been reared as Catholics from birth.

To escape persecution, these colonial Sephardi Jews conversos settled mainly in the northern highlands and northern high jungle. They intermarried with natives and non-Jewish Europeans (mainly Spanish and Portuguese people) in some areas, assimilating to the local people: in Cajamarca, the northern highlands of Piura (Ayabaca and Huancabamba), among others, due to cultural and ethnic contact with people of the southern highlands of Ecuador. Their mixed-race descendants were reared with syncretic Catholic, Jewish, European, and Andean rituals and beliefs.

According to the Jewish Virtual Library, the original attraction for Jews to come to Peru was the mineral potential. Many Jews had come to Portugal disregarding the immigration restrictions placed at the time. This action would then be used in trials against some of these crypto-Jews who faced the Lima tribunal, further adding on a penalty to their actions.

In the first decades of the 19th century, many Sephardi Jews from Morocco emigrated to Peru as traders and trappers, working with the natives of the interior. By the end of the century, the Amazon rubber boom attracted even greater numbers of Sephardi Jews from North Africa as well as Europeans. Many settled in Iquitos, which was the Peruvian center for the export of rubber along the Amazon River. They created the second organized Jewish community in Peru after Lima, founding a Jewish cemetery and synagogue. After the boom fizzled due to competition from Southeast Asia, many European and North African Jews left Iquitos. Those who remained over generations have eventually married native women; their mixed-race or mestizo descendants grew up in the local culture, a mixture of Jewish and Amazonian influences and faiths.

In modern times, before and after the Second World War, some Ashkenazi Jews, chiefly from Western and Eastern Slavic areas and from Hungary, migrated to Peru, chiefly to the capital Lima. The Ashkenazim ignored the Peruvian Jews of the Amazon, excluding them from consideration as fellow Jews under their Orthodox law because their maternal lines were not Jewish.

During the Shoah, Jose Maria Barreto had allegedly secretly issued passports to Jews under Nazi occupation to save them. Though the Peruvian government at the time had forbid European embassies to issue visas to Jewish refugees, Barreto had ignored these orders. According to the World Jewish Congress, 650 Jews fled to Peru during and after the Shoah.

In the late 20th century, some descendants in Iquitos began to study Judaism and eventually made formal conversions in 2002 and 2004 with the aid of a sympathetic American rabbi from Brooklyn, New York City. A few hundred were given permission to make aliyah to Israel. By 2014, nearly 150 more Iquitos Jews had emigrated to Israel.

The Lima Inquisition 

From the January 9, 1570 till 1820, the Holy Office had an inquisition located in Lima to identify Jews, Lutherans, and Muslims through the power of the church and Viceroyalty of Peru. This had forced the crypto-Jews, the Jewish people who would secretly adhere to Judaism while publicly professing another faith, to be targets of the tribunal and lead them to be punished, tortured or killed for their faith. Some crypto-Jews had avoided the tribunals through immigrating out of Spanish colonies like Peru. The point of the inquisition was to control the Christian population of certain colonies, and to punish those who showed faiths that were not Christian. As Peru was in colonial rule to Spain at the time, Peru was forced to be in line with the religious beliefs of the Spanish. It had been illegal to be follow Judaism in any Spanish territory. The first targets of the inquisition were crypto-jews, and later in the 17th and 18th century, the inquisition began to target more people who had seemed to be a threat to Spanish religious integrity. The Jewish Virtual Library argues however, that towards the early 17th century, the tribunal had started to focus on crypto-Jews who were rich and wealthy, as the holy office were able to confiscate their properties after the condemnation. According to Schaposchnik, the stages of the trial followed “a sequence of: denunciation, deposition, imprisonment, hearings, accusation, torture, confession, defense, publication, sentence, and the Auto.” The Auto de Fe were occasional public ceremony of punishments made through the inquisition. The punishments included being burnt to a stake, whipping, and being exiled. The trial had started with the accused being convicted of a crime. The tribunal had often used their connections of viceroyalty to gain information about the New Christians, about their past actions in other Spanish colonies. This was the case of Joan Vincente, who was a Portuguese New Christian who had previously been renounced but was put into trial in 1603. His previous actions in Brazil, Potosi, and Tucuman had all been shared by the viceroyalties in those regions. The genealogies of the crypto-Jews were accessible through this connection, making it possible to accurately see who were New Christians. Since the actions of the accused was often not documented, the accused New Christians in court could not prove their statements, while the viceroyalty could obtain all the documentation needed in the trial. In most trials, the accused New Christians would not give up names of others who are also known to be Judaizing, until they were tortured. After days or weeks of torture, most crypto-Jews gave up other crypto-Jews up to the tribunal. For example, Mencia de Luna, had said during the trial, “tell notaries of the tribunal to write whatever they wanted in her declaration, so that her suffering would come to an end”. Schaposchnik also states that from recorded accounts from 1635 to 1639 of new Christian Portuguese, 110 people were arrested due to their alleged connection to the Great Jewish Conspiracy, with many having to reconcile their faith to Christianity along with being exiled and facing confiscation of property. He states, “As a result of the Auto General de Fe, the community of Portuguese New Christians in Lima were decimated.” It is said that up 11 people were burned at a stake as they did not confess to committing any Judaic practices. According to Silverblatt, though it is not clear that those who were persecuted under the inquisition were practicing Judaism, most of the New Christians in Lima were considered “tainted” even after being baptized. Many New Christians during this time were seen to be inferior to Old Christians being banned from certain professions, entering universities and public offices. The inquisition had those who had been called, to confess to their sins and share information on others who had practiced Judaism in Lima.

A notable figure of those prosecuted in Lima included Manuel Batista Perez, an individual who was considered as “one of the world’s most powerful men in international commerce”. Perez had been arrested once in 1620, when a broad sheet had been found which claimed that Perez was one of the premier teachers of Judaism in Lima. The witnesses and inquisitors considered Perez to be an ‘oracle’ due to his vast knowledge and wealth. Though Peru fought to the best of his abilities during the hearings, the overwhelming evidence against had mounted up. The inquisitors had faced some difficulty in going through with the trial, as Perez was a part of viceroyalty, with many clergy and high figures testifying for his innocence. Some of the evidence submitted in the trial included many New Christians appearing as witnesses calling him the Great Captain of Jews in Peru, along with his brother-in-law denouncing him.

Another notable crypto-Jew that had been in the tribunal was Antonio Cordero, who was a clerk from Seville. He had been originally denounced in 1634 with weak evidence, such as abstaining from work on Saturdays and not eating pork. The tribunal decided to conduct a secret arrest on Cordero, so there would be no one suspecting the inquisitions involvement. They gave him no sequestration, and he confessed that he was a crypto-Jew. After they had tortured Cordero, he gave up the name of his employer and two others, which then gave up the name of more crypto-Jews in Lima. This eventually led to seventeen arrest being made, with many notable merchants being brought to the Tribunal as crypto-jews. According to Lea, this then led to many a frightened Portuguese trying to flee Lima.

Iquitos Jews 
Iquitos Jews, or Amazonian Jews, are Jews of mixed Moroccan Sephardic, Ashkenazi, and/or Indigenous Peruvian descent, and/or those who live in Iquitos and observe some form of Jewish traditions and customs.

Their unique practices come from the mix of Peruvian and Jewish cultures. Some have claimed that there exists a kind of pressure exerted upon this community to adhere to customs that are normative in the broader Jewish community; though these customs have been characterized as specifically Ashkenazi, they are often in fact matters of Jewish law recognized by non-Ashkenazi Jews throughout the world as binding. Iquitos Jews' customs are syncretic to varying degrees, influenced by Catholicism and local traditional spiritual traditions.

The Iquitos community has been rather isolated from the rest of the Peruvian Jewish community, which is concentrated in Lima. During a trip to Iquitos in 1948 and 1949, the Argentine-Israeli geologist Alfredo Rosensweig had noted that the Jews of Iquitos were “almost a hidden community” due to their geographical separation from Lima Jews and the location of Iquitos in the far northeast of the country, inaccessible from Lima by road. At the time that Rosensweig visited, the community did not have a Jewish school, a rabbi, or a synagogue. Most Amazonian Jews in Iquitos are of Christian origin, and consider themselves to be a mix between Christians and Jews. It's believed that was due to the fact that most immigrant Jews who had came to Iquitos in the 19th century were single men, who then married the Christian women of Iquitos. In the 1950s and 60s, the Jews of Iquitos had almost disappeared due to the mass emigration to Lima. The community of Iquitos Jews had not been recognized by the rest of Peru until the 1980s, when Rabbi Guillermo Bronstein, who was then the chief rabbi of the Asociasión Judía del Perú in Lima, was contacted by the Iquitos Jews and visited the community in 1991, subsequently sending resources such as prayer books and other Jewish texts. In 1991, the Sociedad Israelita de Iquitos was established.

The Iquitos community's claims of Jewish status have been subjected to some question by the Orthodox Jewish leaders of Lima, as the only people Jewish law considers to be Jews are those who are born to a Jewish mother, or who have formally converted. Because the community itself says that its founding members were Jewish men and non-Jewish women, their descendents are not always considered Jewish by Jews who adhere to Jewish law. An estimated 80% of Iquitos Jews have made aliyah and emigrated to Israel, and the community now numbers only 50 individuals.

Today
Today, there are about 3,000 Jews in Peru, with only two organized communities: Lima and Iquitos. They have made strong contributions to the economics and politics of Peru; the majority in Lima (and the country) are Ashkenazi Jews. Some families lost part of their wealth and family members because of the Nazis during the Holocaust in the Second World War.

Some have held notable posts:
 Salomón Lerner Ghitis served as Prime Minister of Peru in 2011, during Ollanta Humala's presidency.
 Efraín Goldenberg served as Prime Minister (1994-1995), Foreign Minister (1993-1995), and Finance Minister (1999-2000) in the government of Alberto Fujimori.
 French-born anthropologist Eliane Karp was First Lady of Peru.
 Pedro Pablo Kuczynski, former President of Peru.
 Salomon Libman, footballer.
 David Waisman was Second Vice President of Peru in Alejandro Toledo's government, from 2001 until 2006.

Representation in media
The Fire Within: Jews in the Amazonian Rainforest (2008) is about the Jewish descendants in Iquitos and their efforts to revive Judaism and emigrate to Israel in the late 20th century. It is written, directed and produced by Lorry Salcedo Mitrani.

See also 

 Amazonian Jews
 B'nai Moshe
 Immigration to Peru
 Religion in Peru
 History of the Jews in Latin America and the Caribbean
Peruvian Jews in Israel

References

External links 
 Peru - Jewish Agency for Israel